Tyler Eckford (born September 8, 1985) is a Canadian former professional ice hockey player. Eckford played for the New Jersey Devils organization of the National Hockey League (NHL).

Playing career
As a youth, Eckford played in the 1999 Quebec International Pee-Wee Hockey Tournament with a minor ice hockey team from Langley, British Columbia.

Eckford was drafted by the Devils in the seventh round of the 2004 NHL Entry Draft. Eckford joined the University of Alaska, graduating in 2008. During his junior year at the University of Alaska, Eckford was named to the CCHA All-Conference First Team.

Following university, Eckford joined the Lowell Devils, the American Hockey League (AHL) affiliate of New Jersey. Eckford played three seasons with Lowell, and earned two call-ups to New Jersey. He made his NHL debut on November 20, 2009, in a shootout loss to the Nashville Predators. He recorded his first NHL point the following day against the Dallas Stars in a 5-3 loss. He was reassigned back to the AHL a few games later. On January 15, 2010, Eckford was named to the 2010 AHL All-Star Classic.

After the 2010–11 season, Eckford signed a one-year, two-way contract with the Phoenix Coyotes as a free agent. Eckford played the 2011–12 season with the Portland Pirates, the Coyotes' AHL affiliate.

On July 10, 2012, Eckford signed a two-year, two-way contract with the Ottawa Senators as a free agent.

Career statistics

Awards and honours

References

External links

1985 births
Alaska Nanooks men's ice hockey players
Albany Devils players
Binghamton Senators players
Ice hockey people from Vancouver
Living people
Lowell Devils players
New Jersey Devils players
Portland Pirates players
New Jersey Devils draft picks
Canadian ice hockey defencemen
AHCA Division I men's ice hockey All-Americans